Frank Bianchini (born May 27, 1961) is a former American football running back who played one season for the New England Patriots of the National Football League (NFL). He also played in the Arena Football League (AFL) for the New England Steamrollers, Denver Dynamite, and Charlotte Rage.

Early life and education
Bianchini was born on May 27, 1961 in East Islip, New York. He attended East Islip High School.

Bianchini played college football at Hofstra from 1979 to 1982.

Professional career

New England Patriots
1987 Season

In 1987, Bianchini was signed as a replacement player by the New England Patriots of the National Football League (NFL). He only played in week 6.

New England Steamrollers
1988 Season

In 1988, Bianchini played one game for the New England Steamrollers of the Arena Football League. On offense he had one pass attempt for 9 yards and a touchdown. He also had 5 rushes for 0 yards, and 2 catches for 13 yards. On defense he had two tackles.

Denver Dynamite
1989 Season

In 1989, Bianchini played 4 games for the Denver Dynamite. He had 9 rushes for 21 yards on offense. He also had one pass attempt which was completed for a 21-yard touchdown. On defense he had 8 tackles.

1990 Season

In 1990, he played 8 games. On offense he had 8 rushes for 24 yards and 9 catches for 75 yards. He also had one pass attempt which was completed for a 21-yard touchdown. On defense he had 17 tackles, a sack, and an interception that was returned three yards.

1991 Season

In 1991, he played 7 games. He had 4 catches for 69 yards and a touchdown. He even had one pass attempt, but it was intercepted. On defense he had a sack and 5 tackles.

Charlotte Rage
1992 Season

In 1992 he played 3 games for the Charlotte Rage. He had 4 rushes for 5 yards and 2 catches for 13 yards. He also had a pass attempt. On defense he had 9 tackles. The 1992 season was his final season.

Later life
In 2007, Bianchini was inducted into the Minor League Football Hall of Fame.

References

1961 births
American football cornerbacks
American football running backs
American football wide receivers
Hofstra Pride football players
New England Patriots players
New England Steamrollers players
Denver Dynamite (arena football) players
Charlotte Rage players
Living people
Players of American football from New York (state)